The women's 100 metres hurdles event at the 2014 World Junior Championships in Athletics was held in Eugene, Oregon, USA, at Hayward Field on 25, 26 and 27 July.

Medalists

Records

Results

Final
27 July
Start time: 15:09  Temperature: 26 °C  Humidity: 42 %
Wind: +1.9 m/s

Semifinals
26 July
First 2 in each heat (Q) and the next 2 fastest (q) advance to the Final

Summary

Details
First 2 in each heat (Q) and the next 2 fastest (q) advance to the Final

Semifinal 1
27 July
Start time: 14:33  Temperature: 29 °C  Humidity: 35 %
Wind: +2.2 m/s

Semifinal 2
27 July
Start time: 14:40  Temperature: 29 °C  Humidity: 35 %
Wind: +3.3 m/s

Semifinal 3
27 July
Start time: 14:47  Temperature: 29 °C  Humidity: 35 %
Wind: +3.1 m/s

Heats
25 July
First 4 in each heat (Q) and the next 4 fastest (q) advance to the Semi-Finals

Summary

Details
First 4 in each heat (Q) and the next 4 fastest (q) advance to the Semi-Finals

Heat 1
27 July
Start time: 10:58  Temperature: 18 °C  Humidity: 64 %
Wind: +1.6 m/s

Heat 2
27 July
Start time: 11:06  Temperature: 18 °C  Humidity: 64 %
Wind: +2.7 m/s

Note:
BIB 1314 Iuliia Sokolova - Yellow Card - 162.5(b) Delaying the start

Heat 3
27 July
Start time: 11:13  Temperature: 21 °C  Humidity: 53 %
Wind: +1.7 m/s

Heat 4
27 July
Start time: 11:20  Temperature: 21 °C  Humidity: 53 %
Wind: +1.5 m/s

Heat 5
27 July
Start time: 11:26  Temperature: 21 °C  Humidity: 53 %
Wind: +1.7 m/s

Participation
According to an unofficial count, 37 athletes from 26 countries participated in the event.

References

External links
 100 metres hurdles schedule

100 metres hurdles
Sprint hurdles at the World Athletics U20 Championships
2014 in women's athletics